The 2023 season is Molde's 16th consecutive year in Eliteserien, and their 47th season in the top flight of Norwegian football.

Season events
On 28 December 2022, Chelsea announced that David Fofana would join them on 1 January 2023.

On 6 January, Molde announced the signing of Eric Kitolano to a three-year contract from Tromsø.

On 24 January, Molde announced the signing of Veton Berisha to a four-year contract from Hammarby.

On 25 January, Molde extended their contract with Johan Bakke for an additional season, keeping him at Molde until the end of 2026.

On 31 January, Álex Craninx left Molde.

On 21 February, Molde announced the signing of Anders Hagelskjær from AaB to a four-year contract.

On 22 February, Molde announced the signing of Harun Ibrahim from GAIS to a four-year contract.

Squad

Transfers

In

Out

Released

Friendlies

Competitions

Overview

Eliteserien

Results summary

Results by match

Results

Table

Norwegian Cup

2022–23

2023–24

UEFA Champions League

Squad statistics

Appearances and goals

|-
|colspan="14"|Players away from Molde on loan:
|-
|colspan="14"|Players who appeared for Molde no longer at the club:
|}

Goal scorers

Disciplinary record

See also
Molde FK seasons

References

2023
Molde
Molde